Nils Liljequist (1851–1936) was a Swedish priest, healer, doctor, and one of the fathers of iridology.
After treatment with iodine and quinine, he noticed many differences in the color of his iris.
Growing up, he studied medicine and homeopathy, which is practiced on their customers who come to him in order to remove toxins.

Works
 Quinine And Iodine Change The Colour Of The Iris; I Formerly Had Blue Eyes, They Are Now A Greenish Colour With Reddish Spots – 1871.
 Ögondiagnostiken (Diagnoza z oczów) – 1890 and 1893.
 The Diagnosis from the Eye: Iridology – Uniwersytet w Chicago, 1916, Wydawnictwo Iridology Publishing Company.

See also
 Iridology
 Ignaz von Peczely

References

Bibliography
 
 

1851 births
1936 deaths
20th-century Swedish physicians
19th-century Swedish physicians